Jacob Hindsgaul Madsen (born 14 July 2000) is a Danish cyclist, who currently rides for UCI ProTeam .

Major results

2017
 2nd Time trial, National Junior Road Championships
 8th Overall Internationale Cottbuser Junioren-Etappenfahrt
 10th Road race, UCI Junior Road World Championships
 10th Overall Grand Prix Rüebliland
2018
 1st  Time trial, National Junior Road Championships
 1st Overall Internationale Cottbuser Junioren-Etappenfahrt
1st Stages 2a (ITT), 2b & 3
 2nd Kuurne–Brussel–Kuurne Juniors
 4th Overall Course de la Paix Juniors
 5th Road race, Summer Youth Olympics
 8th La Route des Géants
 8th E3 Harelbeke Junioren
 9th Time trial, UCI Junior Road World Championships
2019
 1st Prologue Giro della Valle d'Aosta
 3rd GP Herning
 10th Sundvolden GP
2020
 1st Stage 1 (TTT) Giro del Friuli-Venezia Giulia
 2nd Il Piccolo Lombardia
 6th Overall Bałtyk–Karkonosze Tour
2021
 6th Overall Étoile d'Or
 8th Overall Tour de l'Avenir
2022
 1st Overall  Tour of Antalya
1st Stage 3
 4th Overall Grand Prix Jeseníky

References

External links

2000 births
Living people
Danish male cyclists
People from Middelfart Municipality
Cyclists at the 2018 Summer Youth Olympics
Sportspeople from the Region of Southern Denmark